Lounés Bendahmane (born 3 April 1977 in Baghlia) is an Algerian former footballer who last played for CR Belouizdad in Algeria.

National team statistics

Honours
 Won the CAF Cup three times with JS Kabylie in 2000, 2001 and 2002
 Won the Algerian League once with JS Kabylie in 2004
 Participated in the 2002 African Cup of Nations in Mali
 Has 5 caps for the Algerian National Team

References

 

1977 births
Living people
Algerian people
People from Baghlia
People from Baghlia District
People from Boumerdès Province
Kabyle people
Algerian footballers
Algeria international footballers
JS Kabylie players
Association football midfielders
USM Annaba players
MC Saïda players
RC Kouba players
CR Belouizdad players
OMR El Annasser players
CA Bordj Bou Arréridj players
2002 African Cup of Nations players
Algerian Ligue 2 players
Algerian Ligue Professionnelle 1 players
JS Bordj Ménaïel players
21st-century Algerian people